Cumberland Reach is a town near Sydney, in the state of New South Wales, Australia. It is located in the City of Hawkesbury north of Sackville.  The locality of Cumberland Reach is unusual in that it is an enclave surrounded completely by the locality of  Lower Portland (although, its southern boundary is directly across the Hawkesbury River from Sackville North).

References

Suburbs of Sydney
City of Hawkesbury